Torso: The Evelyn Dick Story is a 2002 Canadian made-for-television crime thriller film directed by Alex Chapple and starring Kathleen Robertson. It is based on the 1946/1947 murder trial of Evelyn Dick that remains a lurid murder case in Canadian history. After children find only the torso of her missing husband, John, Evelyn is arrested for his murder. The film was originally scheduled to be aired on September 11, 2001, but was delayed until March 18, 2002 due to the terrorist attacks on the original air date.

Plot summary
In 1940s Hamilton, Ontario, after her husband's corpse is discovered in the woods without its head or limbs, beautiful would-be socialite Evelyn Dick (Kathleen Robertson) is arrested by Canadian police for the murder. Her ever-changing jailhouse testimony leads Inspector Woods (Callum Keith Rennie) in various directions as the devoted detective tries to piece together a coherent chain of events and motives. But once Dick's manipulative mother (Brenda Fricker) is implicated in the scheme, Dick's story changes again, this time with twist that leads to a tragic denouement. Her future in grave danger—her sentence could be death by hanging—Dick hires attorney J.J. Robinette (Victor Garber) for one last attempt at freedom.

Cast
 Kathleen Robertson as Evelyn Dick. Robertson was nominated for a Gemini Award for her performance in the film.
 Victor Garber as J.J. Robinette 
 Brenda Fricker as Alexandra MacLean 
 Callum Keith Rennie as Inspector Wood
 Ken James as Donald MacLean 
 Jonathan Potts as Detective Sgt. Preston 
 Jim Boeven as John Dick
 Joseph Scoren as Bill Bohozuk 
 Bruce Gray as Third Trial Judge
 Gerry Quigley as Willy Landeg 
 Joan Gregson as Prison Matron 
 Hannah Lochner as Heather Dick
 David Gardner as Bohozuk's Lawyer 
 William Pappas as First Trial Judge 
 Bruce Clayton as Evelyn's Lawyer

References

Canadian thriller television films
English-language Canadian films
Gemini and Canadian Screen Award for Best Television Film or Miniseries winners
2000s English-language films
2000s Canadian films